Aachen-Mitte is one of the seven boroughs of the city of Aachen, Germany, and contains the quarters of Beverau, Bildchen, Burtscheid, Forst, Frankenberg, Grüne Eiche, Hörn, Lintert, Pontviertel, Preuswald, Ronheide, Rothe Erde, Stadtmitte, Steinebrück and West.

As the center of the city of Aachen, the district is by far the most populated, with over 168,000 residents. It contains both the Aachen Cathedral and Aachen Rathaus, which are each near the city center, as well as Aachen's main theatre. Numerous squares, including Hansemannplatz, Kaiserplatz, and Lindenplatz are likewise contained within the district, as is the medieval Ponttor, which was one of the original gates in the wall surrounding the city.

Sights 
Attractions include:
 the Aachen Cathedral
 the Aachen Rathaus
 the Historical Altstadt
 the medieval Ponttor
 the association football stadium new Tivoli
 Frankenberg Castle
 Burtscheid Abbey
 Aachen's City Gardens
 the Lousberg, a high hill near downtown Aachen
 the  Elisenbrunnen, a hot water spring in downtown Aachen
 the Suermondt-Ludwig Museum, named for the Aachen entrepreneur Barthold Suermondt

References

Aachen